Edward Voigt (December 1, 1873 – August 26, 1934) was a U.S. Representative from Wisconsin who represented Wisconsin's 2nd congressional district.

Early life
Voigt was born in Bremen, Germany. He immigrated to the United States with his parents, who settled in Milwaukee, Wisconsin, in 1883. He was employed in law and insurance offices for several years. He graduated from the law department of the University of Wisconsin–Madison in 1899. He was admitted to the bar the same year and commenced practice in Sheboygan. He served as district attorney of Sheboygan County from 1905 to 1911. He was also the city attorney for Sheboygan from 1913 to 1917.

Congress
Voigt was elected as a Republican to the Sixty-fifth and to the four succeeding Congresses (March 4, 1917 – March 3, 1927) as the representative to Wisconsin's 2nd congressional district. On April 5, 1917, he voted against declaring war on Germany. He was not a candidate for reelection in 1926 to the Seventieth Congress. He served as delegate to the Republican National Convention in 1924.

Career after Congress
He resumed the practice of law in Sheboygan, Wisconsin, after congress. Voigt was elected in 1928 as a judge of the fourth judicial Wisconsin Circuit Court. He served from January 1929 until his death at his summer home at Crystal Lake (in rural Sheboygan County near Elkhart Lake) on August 26, 1934. He was interred in Forest Home Cemetery in Milwaukee, Wisconsin.

References

1873 births
1934 deaths
Politicians from Sheboygan, Wisconsin
University of Wisconsin Law School alumni
Wisconsin state court judges
Republican Party members of the United States House of Representatives from Wisconsin
German emigrants to the United States
People from Elkhart Lake, Wisconsin